Two ships of the Royal Navy have been named HMS Lord Nelson, after the Vice-admiral Horatio Nelson, victor of the Battle of Trafalgar:

  was a storeship purchased in 1800 and sold in 1807.
  was a  launched in 1906.  She was sold in 1920 and was resold in 1921.

Battle Honours
Dardanelles 1915−16

See also
 Ships named , four Royal Navy warships also named after Lord Nelson
 Hired armed cutter : three hired cutters named after Lord Nelson
 , an East Indiaman launched in 1799 and lost without trace in 1809
 , a sail training ship used by the British Jubilee Sailing Trust

Royal Navy ship names